Richard Dowse PC (1824 – 14 March 1890) was an Irish politician, barrister and judge, who was reputed to be the wittiest Parliamentary orator of his time.

Background

He was born in Dungannon, County Tyrone, eldest son of William Dowse, a merchant and Maria Donaldson, daughter of Captain Hugh Donaldson and Mary Vance. He was educated at the Royal School Dungannon and the University of Dublin. As a student, he was briefly involved in the Young Ireland movement. He entered Lincoln's Inn in 1849 and was called to the Irish Bar in 1852. Though he was not a particularly good lawyer: ("he was better known for his wit than his law" a colleague commented sourly), his witty, occasionally scandalous speeches guaranteed him attention and regular press coverage. After practising for some years on the North-Western Circuit, he became Queen's Counsel in 1863 and Third Serjeant in 1867.

Later career

He was elected as Member of Parliament (MP) for Londonderry City at the 1868 general election. He was appointed a Baron of the Court of Exchequer (Ireland) in 1872, having served briefly as Attorney-General and Solicitor-General for Ireland Dowse resided at 38 Mountjoy Square in Dublin's north city centre.

He died suddenly of an apparent heart attack while holding the assizes in Tralee, County Kerry in March 1890. His health had been bad for some time, and he had apparently gone on his last circuit with some trepidation, remarking "I do not want to die in Kerry".

Family
On 29 December 1852, he married Catherine (Kate) Moore, daughter of George Moore of Clones, and they had one son and three daughters, including Charlotte (1855-1934), who married Sir William Sullivan, 3rd Baronet (1860-1937), third son of another eminent judge, Sir Edward Sullivan, 1st Baronet.

Kate died in 1874.

Reputation

He was considered one of the finest and wittiest Parliamentary speakers of the age, and had the ability to crush an opposing speaker. When John Thomas Ball, a future Lord Chancellor of Ireland, asked for the date of a certain event, Dowse replied  gravely that he did not have the precise date, but he thought it was about the time when Ball changed his political allegiance in the hope of getting into the House of Commons.

By comparison with his political speeches, his judgements are generally rather dull, and have little value as precedents. He never had much reputation as a lawyer, although he had the virtues of common sense, clarity and simplicity. Delaney refers to a complex habeas corpus application which Dowse disposed of by saying simply "I'm afraid the prisoner must remain in gaol, and he occasionally showed a touch of his celebrated wit in his judgements.

Maurice Healy tells the story of a later judge who refused to follow a judgement of Dowse's, saying unkindly that "the learned Baron was always better known for his wit than his law". Counsel then gravely embarrassed the judge by pointing out that the House of Lords had given an identical judgment.

Legacy
His obituary notice in The Times of 15 March 1890, read

On his retirement from the House of Commons, Punch magazine published a warm tribute to a man whose humour had been "like an oasis in the desert".

Elrington Ball described him as a man who combined great wit with incisive intelligence and a knowledge of the world.

References

External links
 
 Irish Criminology
 Archiseek Dublin Tour
 

|-

1824 births
1890 deaths
Irish barristers
Solicitors-General for Ireland
Attorneys-General for Ireland
Members of the Parliament of the United Kingdom for County Londonderry constituencies (1801–1922)
UK MPs 1868–1874
Irish Liberal Party MPs
Members of the Privy Council of Ireland
Judges of the High Court of Justice in Ireland
Serjeants-at-law (Ireland)